The Jebel Akhdar or Al Jabal Al Akhdar, is part of Al Hajar Mountains range in Ad Dakhiliyah Governorate of Oman. Jebel Akhdar is famous for its labyrinth of wadis and terraced orchards, where pomegranates, apricots and roses grow in abundance due to its mild Mediterranean climate.

Description
This mostly limestone mountain is one of the highest points in Oman and eastern Arabia. It is this that gives the mountains their "green" name.

An old stronghold on the inland side of the mountain is Birkat al-Mawz, or Pool of the Plantains, with a layout similar to the nearby Jabrin palace

The area is about a 45-minute drive from Nizwa and is known for its traditional rose water extraction and agricultural products including pomegranates, walnuts, apricots, black grapes and peaches. It is also the site of honey bee breeding for much of Oman. Agricultural production is improved by the use of Falaj irrigation channels and their associated terraces system devised by the local farmers, who have lived on this mountain for hundreds of years. Al Sogara is a historic village carved into the mountainside. The Jebel is mostly inhabited by the ancient Arab tribe Bani Riyam (al Riyamy). Most descendants of the tribe are now in the four nearby villages, including Nizwa, Izki and Ibra.

Ecology
Jebel Ahkdar is in the Al Hajar montane woodlands ecoregion. The plant communities on the mountain vary with elevation.

Shrublands and dry grasslands are found from 450 to 1,300 meters elevation. The grasses and shrubs are adapted to arid conditions, and include many drought-deciduous and succulent plants. Typical shrubs include Convolvulus acanthocladus, Euphorbia larica, Grewia tenax subsp. makranica, Jaubertia aucheri, Maerua crassifolia, Moringa peregrina, and Pseudogaillonia hymenostephana.

Semi-evergreen woodlands of sclerophyllous trees are found between 1,350 and 2,350 meters elevation. Common trees and shrubs include Sideroxylon mascatense, Dodonaea viscosa, Olive (Olea europaea), Ebenus stellatus, Grewia villosa, Juniperus seravschanica, Myrtus communis, and Sageretia spiciflora.

Above 2300 meters elevation, open woodlands of juniper (Juniperus seravschanica) predominate, with the shrubs Cotoneaster nummularius, Daphne mucronata, Ephedra pachyclada, Euryops arabicus, Lonicera aucheri, Periploca aphylla, and Sageretia spiciflora.

History
Between 1954 and 1959, the area became a site of the Jebel Akhdar War, a conflict between Omani forces loyal to the sultan of Oman (aided by British soldiers, including the Special Air Service) and Saudi Arabian-backed rebel forces of the inland Imamate of Oman.

In August 2011, Sultan Qaboos designated Jebel Akhdar a nature reserve in a bid to conserve its unique yet fragile biodiversity. A decree issued by Sultan Qaboos established the 'Jebel Akhdar Sanctuary for Natural Sceneries.' The Minister of Environment and Climate Affairs has authority to draft guidelines regulating access and developmental activity within the reserve.

Since 2011, the mountain has featured as the principal climb in the Tour of Oman road bicycle race. In the area, several important rock art sites, with figures dating back to 6000 years ago, have been discovered and studied.

See also

Tourism in Oman
Nakhal
Al Hamra
Samail
Ibra

References

External links

Article by Nizwa.NET
Oman’s Rose Water in Jebel Akhdar 
Oman’s 'Green Mountain' declared nature reserve

Mountains of Oman
Mountain ranges of Asia
Al Hajar Mountains